Sphincterochila insularis is a species of air-breathing land snail, a terrestrial pulmonate gastropod mollusk in the family Sphincterochilidae.

Distribution 
This species occurs on Antikythera island in Greece.

References

Sphincterochilidae
Molluscs of Europe
Endemic fauna of Greece
Gastropods described in 1894